10 x My Age is a 1993 EP by Trumans Water, released by Elemental Records.  It was released as a CD and as a 10" record pressed on white vinyl.

Track listing 

Track listing notes:  "Action Sound Deadman" ends at 3:14 and, after about four seconds of silence, is followed by an unlisted, 44-second excerpt of a Glen Galloway/Soul-Junk demo.  Bandmembers at the time of the release of 10 x My Age stated in interviews that this was a mastering mistake and not a "bonus track".

The versions of "Empty Queen II" and "Enflamed (sic)" on this release are the same as those included on "Hey Fish" and "Godspeed the Punchline", respectively.

References

Trumans Water EPs
1993 EPs
Elemental Records EPs